Dumbrava is a commune in Prahova County, Muntenia, Romania. It is composed of six villages: Ciupelnița, Cornu de Sus, Dumbrava, Trestienii de Jos, Trestienii de Sus and Zănoaga.

References

Dumbrava
Localities in Muntenia